Mikołajki may refer to the following places:
Mikołajki, Kuyavian-Pomeranian Voivodeship (north-central Poland)
Mikołajki, Podlaskie Voivodeship (north-east Poland)
Mikołajki in Warmian-Masurian Voivodeship (north Poland)
Mikołajki, Elbląg County in Warmian-Masurian Voivodeship (north Poland)
Mikołajki, Ełk County in Warmian-Masurian Voivodeship (north Poland)
Mikołajki, Nowe Miasto County in Warmian-Masurian Voivodeship (north Poland)

See also 
Saint Nicholas' Day, called Mikołajki in Polish